The Cromer Knoll Group is a geological group of Early Cretaceous age, found at outcrop in eastern England and developed extensively beneath the North Sea in the UK, Norwegian and Danish sectors and in the Norwegian Sea. It preserves fossils dating back to the Early Cretaceous period.

See also

 List of fossiliferous stratigraphic units in England

References

 

Cretaceous England
Lower Cretaceous Series of Europe